Gustave L'Hopiteau (born 26 April 1860) was a French politician.

Key Positions held 
 Member of Parliament for Eure-et-Loir (1893 to 1912)
 Senator from Eure-et-Loir (1912 to 1930)
 Minister of Justice from (1920 to 1921)

He died on 3 October 1941.

References 

French politicians
1860 births
Politicians from Eure-et-Loir
1941 deaths